The Association For Convenience & Fuel Retailing  (NACS) was founded August 14, 1961, as the National Association of Convenience Stores.  Today it is an international trade association representing more than 2,100 retail and 1,600 supplier company members. NACS member companies do business in nearly 50 countries worldwide, with the majority of members based in the United States. The association serves the convenience and filling station industries by providing industry knowledge, connections and advocacy to ensure the competitive viability of its members' businesses.

NACS defines a convenience store as a retail business that provides the public with a convenient location to quickly purchase a wide variety of consumable products and services, general food and gasoline. While not a fixed requirement, convenience stores have the following general characteristics:
 Off-street parking and/or convenient pedestrian access.
 Extended hours of operation, with many open 24 hours, seven days a week.
 Offer at least 500 stock keeping units (SKUs).
 Product mix includes a significant mix of tobacco, beverages, snacks, candy and grocery items.

Member services and events
The convenience and fuel retailing industry includes companies ranging from those operate one store to those that operate thousands. NACS evaluates the effect policies will have on each member, and the Board of Directors then adopts positions that best represent the interests of the industry was a whole. NACS is the voice of convenience and fuel retailers on Capitol Hill. Here are some of the industry's top issues: 
 Motor Fuels
 Swipe Fee Reform
 Chip & PIN
 EMV
 Data security
 Menu labeling
 SNAP
 Labor
 Tobacco

NACS Research develops and disseminates metrics that provide the industry with performance benchmarks and other useful information.  Customized consulting and research projects can be conducted at an aggregate U.S. market, regional, firm or product level.

The annual NACS Show attracts more than 22,000 industry stakeholders from around the world. Buyers and sellers come together to conduct business, learn from one another and network.  The expo is segmented into six categories: Fuel Equipment & Services, Food Equipment & Foodservice Programs, Candy/Snacks, Facility Development & Store Operations, Merchandise and Technology.

The NACS Show education sessions provide attendees with a deep-dive into specific industry topics, and issues and opportunities. Education sessions range from specific top-of-mind topics, to level of expertise, to store size specifics.

NACS events are designed to strengthen the convenience and fuel retailing industry with relevant and timely topics that include leadership, legislative advocacy, global markets, the newest products and services and targeted educational programs. NACS events are designed to bring together the industry's retailers and suppliers to establish and build connections and exchange ideas.

NACS Magazine features articles that focus on trends, best practices, metrics and advocacy for the convenience and fuel retailing industry.

See also
Convenience Store
List of convenience stores

References

External links
Official website
NACS Show

Convenience stores
Companies based in Alexandria, Virginia
Trade associations based in the United States
Organizations established in 1961
1961 establishments in the United States